Georgia competed at the 2014 Winter Olympics in Sochi, Russia from 7-23 February 2014. The Georgian team consisted of four athletes in two sports. The team also sent seven officials. Georgia's government only decided to send athletes and coaches but no government officials due to the breakup in relations with Russia in the aftermath of the August 2008 war.

Flagbearer
Originally figure skater Elene Gedevanishvili was supposed to be the flagbearer. However, because of training schedules, Gedevanishvili was scheduled to arrive after the opening ceremony. Therefore, alpine skier Nino Tsiklauri was selected to replace her.

Alpine skiing 

According to the quota allocation released on January 20, 2014, Georgia qualified three athletes.

Figure skating 

Georgia achieved the following quota places:

References

External links 
 
 

Nations at the 2014 Winter Olympics
2014
Winter Olympics